Palpita palpifulvata is a moth in the family Crambidae. It was described by Jagbir Singh Kirti and H. S. Rose in 1992. It is found in Arunachal Pradesh, India.

References

External links
Original description: Kirti, J. S. & Rose, H. S. (1992). "Studies on Indian species of the genus Palpita Hübner (Lepidoptera: Pyralidae: Pyraustinae)". J. Ent. Res. 16 (1): 62-77.

Moths described in 1992
Palpita
Moths of Asia